Chinese Taipei competed at the 2014 Winter Olympics in Sochi, Russia from the 7 to 23 February 2014. The Chinese Taipei team consisted of three athletes in three sports, including short track speed skating and speed skating for the first time ever.

Since 1984, athletes from Taiwan  have competed at the Olympics as "Chinese Taipei" due to political reasons. Even though the country's name is Taiwan (Republic of China), due to opposition from China, they compete under a different name.

Luge 

Chinese Taipei received a reallocation quota spot in luge.

Short track speed skating 

Chinese Taipei qualified 1 male athlete for the Olympics during World Cup 3 & 4 in November 2013.

Men

Speed skating 

Based on the results from the fall World Cups during the 2013–14 ISU Speed Skating World Cup season, Chinese Taipei earned the following start quotas:

Men

References

External links 
 
 

Nations at the 2014 Winter Olympics
2014 in Taiwanese sport
2014